Soapbush or soap bush can mean:

 Clidemia hirta, native to the American Neotropics, also found in Australia, Southern Asia and East Africa.
 Noltea africana, native to Southern Africa.
 Acacia holosericea (soapbush wattle), native to Australia.
 Trymalium odoratissimum (karri hazel), native to Western Australia.
 Guaiacum angustifolium, native to North America.
 Ceanothus integerrimus (more commonly known as deer bush), native to North America.
 Rhigozum trichotomum (Khalahari soapbush), native to Southern Africa.
 Helinus integrifolius (also known as soap plant or soap creeper), native to Southern Africa.

See also
 Soapberry
 Alphitonia excelsa,  soap tree
 Soapweed (disambiguation)

Footnote citations